Levi Jones (born May 5, 1998) is an American football linebacker for the Seattle Seahawks of the National Football League (NFL). He played college football at the University of Southern California (USC) before transferring to North Carolina State (NC State) and was signed by the Seahawks as an undrafted free agent in 2022.

Professional career
After going unselected in the 2022 NFL Draft, the Seattle Seahawks signed Jones as an undrafted free agent. He was waived at the final roster cuts, on August 30, 2022, and signed to the Seahawks' practice squad the next day.

Jones was elevated to the active roster on November 12. He made his professional debut the next day against the Tampa Bay Buccaneers in the Seahawks' week 10 game, appearing in 10 special teams snaps. The Seahawks placed Jones back on the practice squad the next day. He was later elevated again to the active roster, playing in the Seahawks' week 13 and 14 games, while being placed back on the practice squad between the games. Jones was elevated to the active roster for the final time on December 31. He played, in total, three games for the Seahawks in 2022.

Personal life
Jones' is the son of Robert Jones, a linebacker who played 10 seasons in the NFL. He is the younger brother of Zay Jones, a wide receiver for the Jacksonville Jaguars, and former Minnesota Vikings wide receiver Cayleb Jones. He is also the nephew of former NFL quarterback Jeff Blake.

References

External links
 Seattle Seahawks bio
 NC State Wolfpack bio

1998 births
Living people
American football linebackers
Players of American football from Austin, Texas
NC State Wolfpack football players
Seattle Seahawks players
USC Trojans football players